Alive Alone is Mickey Thomas's 1981 album.  After joining Jefferson Starship,
Thomas was still under contract to record a second solo album.  Alive Alone was released shortly after the Jefferson Starship album Modern Times, and Grace Slick's album Welcome to the Wrecking Ball!, but the Thomas album did not enter the Billboard chart.

Track listing

Side A
"She's Got You Running" (Andy Goldmark, Jim Ryan) – 4:35
"Alive Alone" (Jules Shear) – 3:19
"Maybe Tomorrow" (Robbie Patton, Jonathan Cain) – 3:35
"Following Every Finger" (Shear) – 3:37
"This Time They Told the Truth" (Frederick Knight) – 4:44

Side B
"Survivor" (Cindy Bullens) – 4:08
"You're Good With Your Love" (Eddie Schwartz) – 3:48
"I Don't Wanna Talk About It" (Bret Bloomfield) – 3:59
"Too Much Drama" (Don Henley, Glenn Frey) – 3:33
"Badge" (Eric Clapton, George Harrison) – 4:16

Personnel

Mickey Thomas – Vocals
George "Chocolate" Perry – Bass
Joe Vitale – Drums
Don Felder – Guitar
She's Got You Running
Donny Baldwin – Background Vocals / Drum Programming
Paul Harris – Piano
Steve Porcaro – Synthesizer
Joe Vitale – Arp
Mickey Thomas – Tambourine
Alive Alone
Paul Harris – Piano
Joe Vitale – Arp / Tambourine
Maybe Tomorrow
Donny Baldwin – Background Vocals
Paul Harris – Piano
Steve Porcaro – Synthesizer
Joe Vitale – Arp
Following Every Finger
Donny Baldwin – Background Vocals
Joe Vitale – Marimba / Percussion
Paul Harris – Organ
The Miami Strings – Strings
This Time They Told the Truth
Julia Tillman Waters – Background Vocals
Maxine Willard Waters – Background Vocals
Oren Waters – Background Vocals
Paul Harris – Piano / Electric Piano
Marty Grebb – Solo Saxophone
The Miami Strings – Strings
Survivor
Donny Baldwin – Background Vocals
Craig Chaquico – Lead Guitar
Paul Harris – Piano
You're Good With Your Love
Julia Tillman Waters – Background Vocals
Maxine Willard Waters – Background Vocals
Oren Waters – Background Vocals
Norton Buffalo – Harmonica
Paul Harris – Piano
Joe Vitale – Synthesizer
I Don't Wanna Talk About It
Chuck Thomas – Background Vocals
Sara Thomas – Background Vocals
Paul Harris – Piano / Clavinet / Prophet Synthesizer
Too Much Drama
Donny Baldwin – Background Vocals
George "Chocolate" Perry – Background Vocals
Joe Vitale – Background Vocals
Paul Harris – Piano
Badge
Paul Harris – Piano
Neal Bonsanti – Alto Saxophone
Dan Bonsanti – Tenor Saxophone
Cory Lerios – Yamaha CS-80 Synthesizer
Roger Homefield – Trombone
Ken Faulk – Trumpet

Production
Produced by Bill Szymczyk and Allan Blazek for Pandora Productions, Ltd.
Engineered by Allan Blazek
Mixed by Bruno Manzioni except "I Don't Wanna Talk About It" mixed by Blaze
Mastered by Ted Jensen

References

Mickey Thomas (singer) albums
1981 albums
Albums produced by Bill Szymczyk